Peter Frost is a British writer, photographer, and archaeologist. He spent much of his time exploring Peru and wrote several books about the country. While leading a National Geographic expedition, Frost discovered the pre-Inca site of Qoriwayrachina. In 1977 Frost was one of the founding members of South American Explorers, a nonprofit travel, scientific and educational organization.

Books
The Pocket Guide to Ecuador
The Pocket Guide to Peru
1995: Machu Picchu Historical Sanctuary
1979: Exploring Cusco

References

Peruvian photographers
British archaeologists
British emigrants to Peru
Living people
Year of birth missing (living people)